UB18 may refer to:

 UB18, a postcode district in the UB postcode area
 SM UB-18, a World War I German submarine